Tamin, Zahedan is a village in Tamin Rural District, in the Nosratabad of Zahedan County, Sistan and Baluchestan Province, Iran. In 2006, its

population was 457, in 81 families.

References 

Populated places in Zahedan County